Eimhjellen is a village in Gloppen Municipality in Vestland county, Norway. The village lies on the eastern shore of the large lake Eimhjellevatnet.

Eimhjellen has a population of around 40 people living on 12 farms. It is an active agricultural environment with cows, sheep, and pigs. There are forests that surround the village and there is a sawmill, planing mill, and carpentry workshop. Many of the residents work outside of the village in addition to working on their farms. People of all ages live in Eimhjellen, from young children to those over 80 years old.

References

External links
Photograph of Eimhjellen in 1922: 

Villages in Vestland
Gloppen